Joseph "Jammy" Acton Morris (28 May 1901 - 1987) was an English geographer and school teacher who was an advocate of geographical field work and president of the Geographical Association. He prepared the Sketch-map Histories series with Irene Richards and numerous other geographical textbooks. He wrote the history of the Latymer School at Edmonton where he taught for 36 years.

Early life and family
Joseph Morris was born on 28 May 1901. He was brought up in Lancashire and received his advanced education at the University of London from where he received his B.Sc. (Econ). He married and had a son, Peter.

Career

Morris joined The Latymer School, Edmonton, in 1926 when an economics course was added to the sixth form syllabus. He was recruited by then headmaster Richard Ashworth and taught subjects from the Lancashire cotton industry to the Indian monsoon. He became head of the geography department in 1931, was made deputy headmaster in 1952, and retired in 1962. He wrote a history of the school that was published in 1975.

Morris was the author with Irene Richards, and George Taylor as general editor, of the Sketch-map Histories series which appeared in multiple volumes and editions from the 1930s to the 1970s. The series combined historical maps with an explanatory text. Their map history of the Great War and after was noted in review for its attempts at impartiality which the reviewer in 1938 felt was generous to some of the belligerents. The final volume in the series, a junior sketch-map economic history of Britain, was criticised in review for being derived from out of date elementary textbooks and being ignorant of developments in the field of economic history in the 35 years prior to its publication.

In 1934, he read a paper to the Congrès Internationale de Géographie at Warsaw on the Wordsworthian idea of the beneficial influence of close contact with nature.

In 1965, Morris became president of the Geographical Association, an organisation for the teaching of geography that Morris had been closely involved with for many years. His appointment was welcomed by the large body of secondary school teachers within the association's membership and in his presidential address he called for increased resources to teach geography in schools and an emphasis on practical field trips so that children could understand that, as his obituary writers in Geography put it, "geography is reality and reality geography".

Death
Joseph Morris died in 1987. He was survived by his son, Dr. Peter Morris.

Selected publications
 A contour dictionary. A short text-book on contour reading with map exercises. George G. Harrap & Co., London, 1945. (multiple later editions)
 The land from the air: A photographic geography. George G. Harrap & Co., London, 1958. (With G.H. Dury)
 The British Isles in map and diagram. Thomas Nelson & Sons, London, 1966. (With Dick Gerald Luxon)
 Landscape and mapcraft: From field study to map. Collins Clear-Type Press, London and Glasgow, 1968.
 London and the London region. Thomas Nelson & Sons, 1968. (Nelsons Geography Studies) 
 The growth of industrial Britain, 1700 to the present day. A work-book and study guide in social and economic history, arranged by J. A. Morris. George G. Harrap & Co., London, 1971. 
 Northwestern Europe: A systematic approach. Nelson, London, 1973. 
 A history of the Latymer School at Edmonton. Governors of the Latymer Foundation, Edmonton, 1975.

Sketch-map Histories
Selected titles. Most volumes exist in multiple editions with different subtitles:
 A sketch-map history of Britain, 1783-1914. G.G. Harrap & Co., London, 1937. (No. 2) (With Irene Richards)
 A sketch-map history of the Great War and after, 1914-35. G.G. Harrap & Co., London, 1938. (No. 3) (With Irene Richards and Jack Bezar Goodson)
 A sketch-map history of Britain, 1688-1914. G.G. Harrap & Co., London, 1940. (No. 5) (With Irene Richards & George Robert Stirling Taylor)
 A sketch-map history of Britain and Europe to 1485. G.G. Harrap & Co., London, 1946. (No. 6) (With Irene Richards)
 A sketch-map economic history of Britain. G.G. Harrap & Co., London, 1957. (No. 6) (With Irene Richards and Joshua Leonard Gayler)
 A junior sketch-map economic history of Britain. G.G. Harrap & Co., London, 1961. (With Irene Richards)

References 

Schoolteachers from Lancashire
English geographers
English non-fiction writers
1901 births
1987 deaths
Alumni of the University of London